Otterberg is a former Verbandsgemeinde ("collective municipality") in the district of Kaiserslautern, Rhineland-Palatinate, Germany. The seat of the Verbandsgemeinde was in Otterberg. On 1 July 2014 it merged into the new Verbandsgemeinde Otterbach-Otterberg.

The Verbandsgemeinde Otterberg consisted of the following Ortsgemeinden ("local municipalities"):

 Heiligenmoschel
 Niederkirchen
 Otterberg
 Schallodenbach
 Schneckenhausen

Former Verbandsgemeinden in Rhineland-Palatinate